John Heffernan (May 30, 1934 – December 3, 2018) was an American film, stage and television actor. He was perhaps best known for playing Eddie Niles in the 1973 film The Sting.

Life and career 
Heffernan was born in Manhattan, New York. He began his career in the 1950s as a stage actor in New York, appearing in Broadway productions and winning an Obie Award. In 1964 he replaced Albert Finney in the title role of the New York production of Luther. His last stage credit was for the 1982 production Alice in Wonderland.

Heffernan began his screen career in 1960, appearing in the anthology television series The Play of the Week. He also played Professor Everett Chambers in the soap opera television series The Doctors, and Chester Markham in Mary Hartman, Mary Hartman. 

In 1973 Heffernan played the role of Eddie Niles in the film The Sting.  Other film appearances included Bringing Out the Dead, 92 in the Shade, 1492: Conquest of Paradise, Gloria, Extreme Measures, and The Fisher King. 

Heffernan retired in 2001, his last credit being in the police procedural television series Law & Order.

Death 
Heffernan died in December 2018, at the age of 84.

Filmography

References

External links 

Rotten Tomatoes profile

1934 births
2018 deaths
People from Manhattan
Male actors from New York (state)
American male film actors
American male television actors
Place of death missing
American male stage actors
20th-century American male actors
Obie Award recipients